is a female Japanese judoka. She won a silver medal at the 2012 Summer Olympics, as well as the gold medal in the heavyweight (+78 kg) division and in the openweight division at the 2010 World Judo Championships.

References

External links
 
 
 
 

1984 births
Living people
People from Itami, Hyōgo
Sportspeople from Hyōgo Prefecture
Japanese female judoka
Olympic judoka of Japan
Olympic medalists in judo
Olympic silver medalists for Japan
Judoka at the 2012 Summer Olympics
Medalists at the 2012 Summer Olympics
Asian Games gold medalists for Japan
Asian Games medalists in judo
Judoka at the 2010 Asian Games
Medalists at the 2010 Asian Games
Universiade medalists in judo
Universiade silver medalists for Japan
Medalists at the 2003 Summer Universiade
Medalists at the 2007 Summer Universiade
20th-century Japanese women
21st-century Japanese women